Volcán Jumay is a volcano in the Jalapa department of Guatemala.

Notes

References

Volcanoes of Guatemala
Jalapa Department